The Valley of the Lost is the seventh book in the Deltora Quest novel series written by Emily Rodda. The final gem from the Belt of Deltora is in the mysterious Valley of the Lost with its guardian only known as the Guardian. To retrieve the gem, Lief, Barda, and Jasmine must play his game. If they win, they get the gem. If they lose they will stay trapped inside the Valley of the Lost forever.

Plot summary
After having reached the Maze of the Beast and finding the amethyst, they continue their journey off to the Valley of the Lost to retrieve the seventh and final gem, the diamond. The seven gems are the lost gems from the Belt of Deltora, which had been stolen by the Shadow Lord to overthrow Lief's country, Deltora. The three travel along the river Tor, passing villages that have been raided by pirates. When they stop for a rest, they see a pirate ship. Realizing that it was the ship that a boy named Dain was captured aboard upon, they steal a rowboat in an attempt to rescue him. After Dain and a polypan climb into their boat, the polypan rows against the flooding currents of the river away from the pirates and toward shore. The polypan jumps out of the boat before the boat reaches the shore, and Lief, Barda, Jasmine, and Dain are floating adrift the violently overflowing river. They drift over a sand bar and arrive at the edges of Tora, a great city that Dain had been trying to travel to. They enter the city, and Dain is significantly weakened by the magic of the purifying entrance. They meet two Resistance members, Doom and Neridah after finding the city deserted. Neridah travels with the trio to the Valley of the Lost to find the seventh gem. Upon entering the valley, they meet the Guardian, who doesn't use physical force, but games to protect the diamond. The Guardian enchants them to enter his castle, and asks them to play a game with him for the diamond. The winner of the game will keep the diamond, but the loser will have to be kept in the valley forever. Scared by this, Neridah runs away, leaving the three behind to play the game. Lief, Barda, and Jasmine manage to find all of the clues and guess the name before the time is up, and realize that the Guardian's name is Endon, the king of Deltora. They also find out that Doom had been there before and won the game, but did not take the gem because of his shock when he realized that the Guardian was actually the king. Lief, Jasmine, and Barda find out the gem is not the real diamond, and leave the castle to find Neridah had stolen it. The diamond curses those who gain the gem by theft, and Neridah dies by tripping on a rock and drowning in a stream. After the trio retrieves the gem, the Valley of the Lost disappears and all of the creatures in it are replaced by people, who reveal themselves to be the people of Tora. They had been turned into their form because they broke a vow that they had sealed by magic by turning King Endon away when he sought refuge with them, as they had no wish to draw the Shadow Lord's forces to them but did not consider the consequences of this action. The Guardian turns into Fardeep, a mere man from Rithmere, but not Endon. The name Endon was actually the Shadow Lord's idea, and was intended to trick any winners of the game. Knowing that they have all seven gems, the three travel with Dain back to Del to find the king who will put on the Belt to banish the Shadow Lord from Deltora.

Characters
Lief: Lief is the main character of the series. Lief was born to parents King Endon and Queen Sharn though he believed them to be Jarred and Anna of the forge. As a child Lief roamed the streets of Del, sharpening his wits and gaining him the skills needed for his future quests. Though he did not know it, he was constantly protected by Barda and he prided himself on his many 'lucky' escapes. On his sixteenth birthday it is revealed to him that he must begin a dangerous quest to find the lost gems of the Belt of Deltora.
Barda: Barda was enlisted as a friend by the king and queen of Deltora and was trusted to help him find the lost gems of Deltora sixteen years before the initial story took place. For the next sixteen years Barda disguised himself as a beggar so as to discover information vital to the quest. He also became the bodyguard of Endon and Sharn's child Lief, albeit without the semi-arrogant Lief's knowledge thereof. Upon Lief's sixteenth birthday Barda revealed himself to Lief and the quest for the gems of Deltora began. Though Barda was at first annoyed to travel encumbered by a child, he soon saw Lief as more of a help than a hindrance.
Jasmine: Jasmine is a wild girl, described as having wild black hair (dark green hair in the anime) and emerald green eyes who has grown up in the Forests of Silence, where Lief and Barda meet her shortly after leaving Del. Her parents, Jarred and Anna, were captured by Grey Guards when she was seven years old, and so she has been raised by the forest. She can understand the language of the trees and of many animals, and has incredibly sharp senses, but has trouble understanding some social customs. Jasmine is usually seen with her raven, Kree, and a mouse-like creature she calls Filli. Jasmine is like Lief and occasionally has a quick temper. After helping Lief and Barda in the forest and with the help of the topaz, she is greeted by her mother's spirit from beyond the grave, who tells her to go with Lief and Barda in their quest. After this encounter, she joins Lief and Barda in the search for the great gems that will complete the Belt.
Kree: Kree is a raven and one of Jasmine's closest companions in the Forest of Silence. His family was taken and eaten by the witch Thaegan, and Kree was found by Jasmine. She took pity on him, as both had their family taken away, and she took care of Kree. Kree treats Jasmine as his master, and does not tolerate offensive behavior towards Jasmine. His presence is advantageous towards the three companions, as he is able to fly ahead and warn the others of oncoming danger or safety. And on the second episode, he kills Thaegan by stabbing her on the finger.
Filli: Filli is a small, mouse-like creature (although Jasmine denies that he resembles any rodent). He was rescued by Jasmine when she discovered him paralyzed by the Wenn in The Forests of Silence. As such, he remains close to Jasmine and Kree, often hiding himself in Jasmine's clothing when danger arises. Like Kree, Jasmine is able to understand Filli. His small size is often advantageous to Lief, Barda and Jasmine, as he is able to hide easily and eavesdrop on others.
Fardeep: The Guardian of the diamond. He has four terrible creatures as pets, Hate, Envy, Greed and Pride, who are in fact living growths, attached to him. He makes up a game and calls himself Endon, king of Deltora. If they win, and do guess his name, he will give them the diamond.

See also

Deltora series
Deltora Quest 1
Characters in the Deltora series
Emily Rodda

External links
American Deltora website
Australian Deltora Quest website
Emily Rodda's official website
Deltora Quest anime website

2002 Australian novels
2002 fantasy novels
Australian children's novels
Australian fantasy novels
Children's fantasy novels
Deltora
Fictional valleys
2002 children's books